Megachile maackii is a species of bee in the family Megachilidae. It was described by Radoszkowski in 1874.

References

Maackii
Insects described in 1874